Wild Spirit Wolf Sanctuary (WSWS) is an animal sanctuary in Candy Kitchen, New Mexico, United States, dedicated to rescuing and providing sanctuary for captive-bred wolves and wolfdogs.  It is a 501(c)(3) non-profit organization.

Across the road from the sanctuary is a campground also run by the WSWS. Visitors who stay at the campground on the weekend can help feed the animals, joining volunteers as they give the wolves breakfast.

History
Originally called the Candy Kitchen Rescue Ranch, WSWS was founded in 1991 by Jacque Evans. Evans, a wolfdog owner herself, realized that few people could handle such high-maintenance pets. She decided to create a refuge for unwanted wolves and wolfdogs on her property in Candy Kitchen. She supported animal rescues and the ranch by selling her artwork.

In 1993, Barbara Berge, who was rescuing wolfdogs in Albuquerque, moved to Candy Kitchen and helped Jacque transform the rescue ranch into a non-profit organization.

In 2003, Candy Kitchen Rescue Ranch was reorganized into the Wild Spirit Wolf Sanctuary, and Leyton Cougar became executive director.

In August, 2020, Brittany McDonald became Executive Director of Wild Spirit Wolf Sanctuary, replacing out-going Director of Operations, Crystal Castellanos.

Goals and mission
Wild Spirit has three primary missions: rescue, sanctuary, and education:

 RESCUE: "To rescue non-releasable, captive-bred, displaced, and unwanted wild canids, especially as a direct result of the exotic pet trade."
 SANCTUARY: "To provide each rescue with permanent, safe sanctuary and lifelong care addressing physical, mental, and emotional health and wellness through species-specific nutrition, medical support, enrichment, and animal companionship, when applicable"
 EDUCATION: "To educate the public about the plight of our rescued wild canids while providing species-specific information, focusing especially on wolfdogs, how to tell the difference between a wolf, a wolfdog, and a domestic dog, and about the ethical care and treatment of domestic and wild animals alike."

Impact
Wild Spirit Wolf Sanctuary operates with an “Animals Come First” attitude.

Wild Spirit teaches the public about the humane treatment of wild animals, about the relationships between people and other life through respectful, compassionate co-existence, and about humanity’s important role as having the choice to be a part of the change needed to see ecosystems heal and thrive.

Care is customized to each animal’s needs, desires, personality, and health. Wild Spirit understands that some animals will never want human attention, and we respect that wish by ensuring socialization is never forced.

Wild Spirit Wolf Sanctuary does not breed, sell, or exploit their rescues. All educational programs are offered on-site and are hands-off to reduce stress on the animals.

Guided tours 

Visitors can take guided tours of the sanctuary to see the animals. Tours are about an hour in length. They start in the gift shop and they are about 1/4 miles long. The sanctuary also offers tours specifically for visitors to feed the wolves, plan enrichment for the animals, or tour the entire compound over a period of 1–2 hours. Private group tours are also available.

Notes

External links

Wild Spirit 6 Minute Documentary Video

Protected areas of Cibola County, New Mexico
Organizations established in 1991
Non-profit organizations based in New Mexico
Wildlife sanctuaries of the United States
Wolf organizations
Animal sanctuaries
Dog parks in the United States
Protected areas of New Mexico
Tourist attractions in Cibola County, New Mexico
501(c)(3) organizations
1991 establishments in New Mexico
Wolf parks